John Graham & Company, or John Graham & Associates was the name of an architectural firm, founded in 1900 in Seattle, Washington, by English-born architect John Graham (1873–1955), and maintained by his son John Graham Jr. (1908–1991).

The firm was responsible for many Seattle landmarks and a number of significant structures nationwide, including the Space Needle, the Chase Tower of Rochester, New York, and the Westin Seattle.

The firm was merged into the DLR Group on May 19, 1986, and the name saw full deletion in 1998.

John Graham
John Graham was born in Liverpool, England in 1873. He apprenticed as an architect in England as a young man. First visiting Seattle, Washington, in 1896, he immigrated to the United States in 1900, starting a one-man architectural practice in Seattle. He started off modestly, designing mainly industrial-related buildings and private residences. His first notable project was designing the reconstruction of the Trinity Parish Church at Eight Avenue and James Street in 1902 after it had been damaged by fire.

After a brief partnership with Alfred Bodley in 1904, Graham founded the firm of Graham & Myers with David J. Myers in 1906. He would work with Myers until 1910. As architect for the Ford Motor Company, he designed more than 30 of Ford's assembly plants between 1912 and 1940. Throughout the 1920s and 30s, he would design hundreds of commercial and public buildings in the Seattle area including the Frederick & Nelson store (now Nordstrom) in 1916.  He also helped found the Seattle Yacht Club and designed all of their original facilities.

He retired from architecture in 1945 and died on March 20, 1955, while on tour in Hong Kong.

John Graham Jr.

John Graham Jr. (1908–91) was born and raised in Seattle, Washington.  After graduating from Yale University, he established a short-lived satellite office of his father's firm in New York City in 1937, and took over the main office in 1946. Renaming the firm to John Graham & Company, the firm expanded a relatively modest regional practice to an office with national presence.  It was ultimately responsible for over a thousand commissions.

Their primary focus was commercial projects.  Many were straightforward mid-century modernist office towers, such as San Francisco's 1967 44 Montgomery tower.  But Graham was also responsible for early development of the enclosed shopping mall genre, notably Seattle's Northgate Shopping Center, which opened April 21, 1950, which anticipates the better-known Northland Center in Detroit by four years.  The firm would go on to design seventy malls nationwide.

The authorship of Graham's single most prominent work, the Space Needle, is disputed.  Both Graham's office and the Seattle architect Victor Steinbrueck, a consultant on the project, claimed design credit; the design was also influenced by the Century 21 Exposition design standards and aerospace theme established by supervising architect Paul Thiry.  Clearly the revolving restaurant, the "Eye of the Needle", was Graham's conception.  He'd already devised "La Ronde" for the Ala Moana Shopping Center in Honolulu in 1961, and was awarded a patent for the idea in 1964.

Graham died in Seattle on January 29, 1991.

Prewar work 

The following structures are in Seattle unless otherwise noted:

 reconstruction of the Trinity Episcopal Parish Church, circa 1903
 Butterworth Building, 1903
 Pierre P. Ferry House, 1903–1906
 Joshua Green Building, 10 floors, 1910
 Bellingham National Bank Building, Bellingham, Washington, 1912–1913, with F. Stanley Piper
 Securities Building, 10 floors, 1918
 Frederick & Nelson, now the Nordstrom flagship store, 10 floors, 1918
 Dexter Horton Building, 14 floors, 1924
 Bank of California Building (Seattle), 3 floors, 1924
 Villa Academy, formerly Sacred Heart Orphanage, 1924
 Washington Building, 17 floors, 1925
 Montague & McHugh Building, Bellingham, Washington, 5 floors, 1927
 Hotel Georgia, 12 floors, 1927
 The Bon Marché flagship store, now Amazon.com, 7 floors, 1928
 UW Physics Building (now Mary Gates Hall), 1928
 The Roosevelt, 20 floors, 1929
 Joseph Vance Building, 14 floors, 1929
 Hartford Building, 1929
 U.S. Marine Hospital, now the Pacific Medical Center, with Bebb and Gould, 1930
 Exchange Building, 22 floors, 1930
 Tacoma Municipal Building (Medical Arts Building), 17 floors, 1931
 St. Edward Seminary, Kenmore, Washington, 80,000 square feet, 1931

Postwar work 

 The Decatur, Seattle, residential building, 13 floors, 1950 
 Northgate Mall, 1950
 Gulfgate Mall, Houston, 1956
 Northshore Mall, Peabody, Massachusetts, 1957
 AIA Building, 12 floors, 1958
 Ala Moana Office Building, Honolulu, 23 floors, including the first revolving restaurant in the United States, 1960
 College Grove Shopping Center, San Diego, regional outdoor shopping center with 3-story department store
 Space Needle, an element of the 1962 Century 21 Exposition, with Victor Steinbrueck (disputed), 1962
 Moorestown Mall, Moorestown, New Jersey, 1963 
 The Ilikai Hotel, Waikiki, Honolulu, 1964
 44 Montgomery, Financial District, San Francisco, 43 floors, 1967
 Holiday Park Plaza, 16 floors, 1967
 Montgomery Mall, Bethesda, Maryland, 1968
 Westin Seattle, south tower 1969 (built as the Washington Plaza Hotel), north tower 1982
 Ala Moana Hotel, the tallest building in Hawaii from 1970 through 1990, 38 floors, 1970
 Chase Tower, Rochester, New York, 27 floors, 1973
 901 Fifth Avenue, originally Bank of California Building, 42 floors, 1973
 Henry M. Jackson Federal Building, (joint venture with Bassetti/Norton/Metler/Rekevics), 37 floors, 1974
 One Capital Center, 14 floors, 1975
 State Office Building, 11 floors, 1975
 ABC Building, 33 floors, 1976
 Qwest Plaza, 33 floors, 1976
 Southern Union Tower, 20 floors, 1980
 US Federal Building & Courthouse, 1981
 Lloyd Center Tower, Portland, Oregon, 20 floors, 1981
 Clackamas Town Center, suburban Portland, Oregon, 1981
 Sheraton Seattle Hotel, 34 floors, 1982

References

Architecture firms based in Washington (state)
Companies based in Seattle
Architects from Seattle